Mary Margaret "Peggy" O'Shea (October 3, 1922 – May 1, 2014) was an American screenwriter. She wrote primarily for daytime soap operas.

Biography
Born in Niagara Falls, New York, O'Shea began writing for television with her former husband Lou Shaw for such series as Dr. Kildare, Ben Casey, and Have Gun – Will Travel.

She later served as head writer for One Life to Live from 1979 to 1983, Capitol from 1983 to 1984, and again for One Life to Live from 1984 to 1987. She also wrote for Peyton Place. She and her husband Lou wrote the script of "The Pearl Necklace" (with Hazel Court and Edward Truex), for a 1961 episode of Alfred Hitchcock Presents. She won a Writers Guild of America Award and a Daytime Emmy Award for her work on One Life to Live. She was also nominated for a total of four Writers Guild of America Awards and five Daytime Emmy Awards.

While writing for One Life to Live, O'Shea lived in New York City, and she later moved to Los Angeles. On May 1, 2014, she died of complications from a stroke. She was 91. She was survived by a son from her marriage to Shaw.

Awards and nominations

Daytime Emmy Awards

WINS 
 (1987; Best Writing; One Life to Live)

NOMINATIONS 
 (1980, 1981, 1982 & 1983; Best Writing; One Life to Live)

Writers Guild of America Award

WINS 
 (1986 season; One Life to Live)

NOMINATIONS 
 (1979 & 1987 seasons; One Life to Live)
 (1984 season; Capitol)

Head writing tenure

References

External links

1922 births
2014 deaths
American women screenwriters
People from Niagara Falls, New York
Daytime Emmy Award winners
Women soap opera writers
Writers Guild of America Award winners
American television writers
Screenwriters from New York (state)
21st-century American women